Ọláyínká  is a given name (rooted from Yinka) and surname of Yoruba origin, meaning "a combination of prestige, success and wealth surrounds me". Notable people  with the name include:

First name
Olayinka Koso-Thomas (born 1937), Nigerian-born doctor established in Sierra Leone
Olayinka Sanni (born 1986), American-Nigerian basketball player
Olayinka Sule, Nigerian Brigadier General and Administrator of Jigawa State, Nigeria

Middle name
Folashade Olayinka Baderinwa (born 1969), American journalist
Jadesola Olayinka Akande (1940–2008), Nigerian academic
Olajide Olayinka Williams "JJ" Olatunji (born 1993), known professionally as KSI, English YouTuber, rapper and boxer

Surname
Abel Idowu Olayinka (born 1958), Nigerian Professor of Applied geophysics
Funmilayo Olayinka (1960–2013), Nigerian banker and politician 
Peter Olayinka (born 1995), Nigerian football player 
Segun Olayinka (born 1988), Nigerian cricketer
Folake Olayinka, Nigerian physician

References

Yoruba given names
Yoruba-language surnames